South Korea (IOC designation:Korea) participated in the 1998 Asian Games held in Bangkok, Thailand from December 6 to December 20, 1998.

Medal summary

Medal table

Medalists

References

Korea, South
1998
Asian Games